Sphaerophoria rueppelli  is a Palearctic hoverfly. Identification is problematic and this species is little known.

References

Diptera of Europe
Syrphini
Insects described in 1830